Noah Abrams (born January 23, 1998) is an English-born-American soccer player who plays as a goalkeeper for Charlotte Independence on loan from Miami FC in the USL Championship.

Career

Youth
Born in New York City, Abrams moved to England with his family when he was six years old. While living in England, Abrams played for numerous Premier League Youth Academies including Arsenal, Chelsea, Tottenham and Crystal Palace. At the age of 17, Abrams moved back to America to continue his education. He attended the Berkshire School, where he played for three years as part of the soccer team, where he served as captain. Abrams played club soccer for Black Rock FC, where he captained the team for two years.

Abrams holds citizenships from the United States, Great Britain and Israel.

College & Amateur
In 2017, Abrams began attending Northeastern University, where he also played college soccer. In 2018, he suffered a serious concussion in a match which ended his season. In three seasons from 2017 to 2019 (the 2020 season was cancelled due to the COVID-19 pandemic), he made 20 appearances for the Huskies, recording 59 saves and 6 clean sheets.

In the spring of 2019, Abrams was voted the Northeastern Athletics Excellence in Strength and Conditioning award for efforts in rehab and recovery from his serious concussion suffered in the fall of 2018.

Whilst at college, Abrams also appeared in the USL PDL for FA Euro New York in 2017, making two appearances. In 2018, he played with Brazos Valley Cavalry, making two further appearances in the PDL.

Professional
In 2020, Abrams trained with USL Championship side Loudoun United, before signing his first professional contact with Israeli Liga Leumit side Beitar Tel Aviv Bat Yam.

On April 2, 2021, Abrams returned to the United States to join Loudoun United. Abrams made his professional debut on 8 September 2021, starting against Charlotte Independence in a loss.

Abrams signed with Miami FC on January 31, 2022. In early June, Abrams joined USL League One's Charlotte Independence on a short-term loan deal. Despite only playing one game for Charlotte, Abrams won save of the week for one of his stops while on loan. In March 2023, Abrams again joined Charlotte on loan.

References

1998 births
Living people
Association football goalkeepers
Beitar Tel Aviv Bat Yam F.C. players
Brazos Valley Cavalry FC players
Charlotte Independence players
English expatriate footballers
English expatriate sportspeople in Israel
English expatriate sportspeople in the United States
English footballers
Expatriate soccer players in the United States
F.A. Euro players
Footballers from Greater London
Loudoun United FC players
Miami FC players
Northeastern Huskies men's soccer players
People from Sheffield, Massachusetts
Soccer players from Massachusetts
USL Championship players
USL League One players
USL League Two players